Drepanosticta brincki (Brinck's shadowdamsel) is a species of damselfly in the family Platystictidae. It is endemic to Sri Lanka.

Sources
 Biodiversity of Sri Lanka
 Animal diversity web
 List of odonates of Sri Lanka

Damselflies of Sri Lanka
Insects described in 1970